Ivan Artemovych Tymchenko 3 March 1939 – 12 August 2020) was a Ukrainian jurist, chairman of the Constitutional Court between 1996 and 1999.

On 1967, Tymchenko graduated from the Laws Faculty of the Taras Shevchenko National University of Kyiv.

In September 1996, President of Ukraine appointed him as magistrate of the Constitutional Court and one month later, on 19 October, became its chairman until 18 October 1999. He died on 12 August 2020.

External links 
 Constitutional Court of Ukraine website
 Сайт Національної академії правових наук

References 

1939 births
2020 deaths
People from Dnipropetrovsk Oblast
University of Kyiv, Law faculty alumni
Constitutional Court of Ukraine judges
Knights Commander of the Order of Merit of the Federal Republic of Germany
Recipients of the Order of Prince Yaroslav the Wise, 4th class
Recipients of the Order of Prince Yaroslav the Wise, 5th class
Recipients of the Order of Prince Yaroslav the Wise, 3rd class
Laureates of the Honorary Diploma of the Verkhovna Rada of Ukraine
Recipients of the Honorary Diploma of the Cabinet of Ministers of Ukraine